The Theban Tomb TT100 is located in Sheikh Abd el-Qurna, part of the Theban Necropolis, on the west bank of the Nile, opposite to Luxor. It is the mortuary chapel of the ancient Egyptian vizier Rekhmire. There is no burial chamber next to this chapel. The vizier's tomb is elsewhere, perhaps even in the Valley of the Kings.

The tomb

Hall

Using the labeling in Porter and Moss, there are eleven scenes or combinations of scenes inscribed in the hall of TT100.
 The lintel and jambs of the entry into the hall show offering scenes.
 Rekhmire inspects officials and other individuals. The duties of a vizier are recorded in the text. Further scenes show tax collection.
 Autobiographical text
 Rekhmire and attendants record foreign tribute including Keftiu offer decorative vases, Nubians are depicted with animals such as leopards, giraffe, cattle and more, the Syrians offer tribute including chariots, horses, a bear and an elephant.
 Rekhmire's installation as vizier before Thutmosis III.
 Tax collection scenes. Records from Upper Egypt including pigeons, gold, honey and cattle.
 Rekhmire inspecting temple workshops and provisions. A scene showing royal statues, and baking, cooking and brewing scenes.
 Rekhmire inspecting cattle and crops and further agricultural scenes.
 A family group including Rekhmire's son Menkheperresonb, Rekhmire's grandfather the vizier Amethu (TT83) and his uncle, the vizer User (TT61) accompanied by their wives. Another scene includes his son Amenhotep, his son Neferweben and Baki with their respective wives and relatives.
 Rekhmire performing inspections.
 A desert hunting and fowling scene.

Passage

The passage is further decorated with scenes. The numbering follows Porter and Moss.
 The lintel and jambs of the doorway are inscribed with texts of the deceased.
 Three registers record the preparation, transportation and storage of temple provisions. A further three registers record the delivery of rations and keeping records of temple serfs.
 Four registers show industries such as vase and jewelry making, leather working, carpentry and metal work. Another four registers depict temple related work including brick making, hauling stone and carving of colossi, freight ships delivering materials and groups of men with overseers being recorded by scribes.
 Funeral procession.
 Sons Menkheperresonb, Mery, Amenhotep and Senusert offering to Rekhmire and his wife Meryt.
 Sons greeting Rekhmire after his return from acclaiming Amenhotep II
 Rekhmire with wife, daughters and sons at a banquet.
 Rites before statues of the deceased Rekhmire and preparation of provisions.
 Sons Menkheperresonb, Amenhotep and Senusert offering to Rekhmire and his wife Meryt.
 A niche scenes showing Rekhmire offering to Osiris, Menkheperresonb offering to Rekhmire and Meryt. False doors were present with texts flanking them.

See also
 List of Theban tombs

References

Buildings and structures completed in the 15th century BC
Theban tombs